Leesville is an unincorporated city of 384 residents distributed over 51 square miles in the Gonzales—Guadalupe County area in Texas, United States, electorally known as local Precinct 13; defined by the south of its Capote Hills ("El Capote Ranch") at the "Leesville Quad" intersection (Farm to Market Road 466 / Texas State Highway 80) and the north of Sandies Creek (Farm to Market Road 1117 / Texas State Highway 80 / Texas State Highway 97), twelve miles southeast of Seguin. Beginning in the 19th-century, the municipal identity of Leesville was founded upon being one of the first Justice of the Peace Precincts of its original county-area, as prescribed in the Texas Constitution; as well as once generally serving as the primary seat of a former Texas House District 90, once rated at more than 1,000 constituents. Straddling and nearing the southeastern border of Guadalupe County, the real estate origins of Leesville go back to the 1800s survey-plots of Texas Revolution figures Ezekiel Wimberly Cullen (late owner of Sandies Creek) and Count Joseph de la Baume of France (late owner of Capote Hills); the latter retaining Texas's founding father Stephen F. Austin as an attorney, to reacquire the early-1800s Spanish land-tract, after Mexico's Independence from Spain in 1825. Divided by Farm to Market Road 1682 joining with Gonzales—Guadalupe County Road 121 West, Leesville's northern territory is closest to the Austin Metropolitan Areas through Texas State Highway 80 / U.S. Route 183 in Texas, while the southern territory is closest to the San Antonio Metropolitan Areas through Texas State Highway 97 / U.S. Route 87 in Texas.

In 1844, De la Baume's heirs sold out to newly-elected Judge Michael Erskine, a then-future Confederate Army commander of the Sandies Creek, Leesville area; the namesake of Leesville's founder "N. Guinn" serving under this "Sandies Home Guard" as a Third Lieutenant in 1861. Erskine held most of the land in the Leesville-area until 1882 when it was purchased by a group of speculative investors, including Mrs. Theodore Roosevelt. The lien on the property was held by the Scottish-American Mortgage Company, Ltd., financiers of the well-known Swan Land and Cattle Co. and Prairie Land and Cattle Co. The original 12-acre residential Capote Ranch headquarters in the "Alameda" of Downtown San Antonio, formerly known as "La Baume Place" upon the St. Joseph Catholic Church, has since been relinquished and divested from the property. From this time period into present-day, just before and after Judge Leroy G. Denman took ownership, the complexities of this large estate and its jurisdiction have led to direct interventions by late San Antonio mayor John W. Smith; and the Texas Courts of Appeals (its caselaw cited in ConocoPhillips Co. v. Ramirez), through the trust of Trinity University and the San Antonio Museum of Art.

As the 19th-century concluded, its expatriate George W. Littlefield acted as a significant Texan architectural patron and proprietor of the Driskill Hotel, the Littlefield House and the Littlefield Building in Austin, Texas; he relocated to what is now Downtown Austin after three of his family members died in a gunfight in 1880s Leesville. During the Spanish–American War, Theodore Roosevelt rode a Capote, Leesville area horse, "Seguin", at the Battle of San Juan Hill (1898). Several other horses from the area were used by the 1st United States Volunteer Cavalry ("Roosevelt's Rough Riders") as well. During this time, Frederick Law Olmsted, then-future designer of New York City’s Central Park, made the area’s principal species of trees and agriculture as a point of his studies.

Through the early 20th-century, rail transport and interurban rail were proposed and built intermittently, including a 1916 Houston—San Antonio electric railway concept and proposal, with Leesville as a main line station. Towards the late 20th-century, the ventures either remained undeveloped or developed then terminated with the rail easements sold to the Lower Colorado River Authority, as an overhead power line. At present, the primary industries of the Capote-Sandies, Leesville area are under the real estate holdings of vast Texas Wildlife Management Areas, and the primary Quien Sabe Ranch that raises Santa Gertrudis cattle of King Ranch Running W Bull descent. The most valuable asset in this area is a $149-million water facility and 40-mile pipeline, that can store and move up to 11.6 million gallons of water towards the Greater San Antonio areas. According to the Texas Department of Transportation, 12,179 vehicles travel through the Leesville-area daily, with the busiest intersection rated at 2,978 vehicles; thru-traffic utilizes Leesville routes to generally bypass Texas State Highway 123 upon Wilson County—Seguin.

Services

In 2000, Leesville had 7 businesses. It is situated at the southeastern Guadalupe County line upon Gonzales County, approximately 19 miles south of U.S. Route 183 in Texas North in Luling (Greater Austin) and 26 miles west of U.S. Route 183 in Texas South in Gonzales.
The historical city center of Leesville is located alongside the street of Farm to Market Road 1682, where the city’s original church and cemetery reside; currently acting as a location for local events.

Leesville is within 59 miles of the city centers of these significant, medium-to-large cities; respectively: Seguin, New Braunfels, Schertz, Lockhart, Universal City, San Marcos, Converse, Live Oak, Kirby, Kyle, Canyon Lake, San Antonio, Leon Valley, Pleasanton and Austin.

Economy

In 2016, Leesville business owners earned, in total, an estimated $1.3 million. Through 1999–2018, the aggregate household income for the city ranged from $7.8-$10.6 million annually.

All commercial and residential properties in Leesville paid a combined estimate of $192,500 in property taxes in 2016.

In 2019 as rated by the Texas Department of Transportation, the aggregate annual-average-daily-traffic (AADT) of all local state highway-segments, that intersected into the Capote-Sandies, Leesville area, was rated at 12,179 vehicles. The Midtown-Downtown Texas State Highway 80/Farm to Market Road 1682 intersection was rated at 2,978 vehicles.

Real estate

As of 2018, Leesville was rated as having 249 residential structures with a total of 1,253 rooms; 825 of these were rated as owner-occupied, 184 were rated as renter-occupied. The vast majority of these renters are not charged "cash rent;" the 9 cash renters in Leesville pay from $150-$199 per month. Within Gonzales County, generally any subdivision or "improvement" of land less than 10 acres must be directly approved by the County Commission; approximately zero residential structures have been approved and built in Leesville, Gonzales County after 2014, as recorded by the census in 2017.

The local median cost of housing, as of 2016–2018, ranges from $546 to $633 per month; with the households of the city paying an aggregate $23,500 in annual property taxes. In estimation, of local workers 16 years and over who do not work at home, 16% commute within 5 minutes of their place of work; 28% commute within 15 to 24 minutes; 56% commute half an hour or more.

An estimated majority of homes (40.5%) in the area were built from 1980 to 1999. The estimated median year Leesville homes were moved into was 1996.

Through 2000–2018, all occupied residential real estate in Leesville was valued from 13.9 to 19.6-million dollars, leading to a residential value density of more than $400.00 per acre, of 32-thousand acres of Leesville land. As of 2020, vacant Leesville land not yet developed, sold at $4,649 per acre; based on recent volume-land sales data of more than 200 acres; within the same time period, an additional sample of volume-land sales data of more than 300 acres, indicates $4,995 per acre.

Overall, historical pricing includes 26,568 acres of the late Joseph de la Baume's "El Capote Ranch," the majority of Leesville's land; appraised and inventoried in 1862: The Guadalupe County side priced at $28,780.00, while the Gonzales County side priced at $9,965.00. In 1872, 17,623 acres of El Capote in Gonzales—Guadalupe County was priced at $35,246.00. This 19th-century data indicates original pricing at or less than $2 per acre, not adjusting for inflation.

Civic

Leesville has a post office with the zip code of 78122. The U.S. Postal Service offered to close the Leesville Post Office in 2011, leading to a resident litigating post office limitations on Leesville mail service in 2021. Under postal code 78122, the Leesville post office serves relevant areas from Farm to Market Road 466 (Capote Road) to Texas State Highway 97; with the UPS and FedEx parcel services offering doorstep service to every residential address.

Public education in the areas of Leesville are provided by Gonzales Independent School District, Nixon-Smiley Consolidated Independent School District and Seguin Independent School District. Since 1998, an organization known as the Happy Quilters has produced quilts for auction at the annual Leesville Country Fair, to maintain Leesville landmarks such as the Leesville school house; while supporting local education, by raising $1,000 or more in support per quilt.

Leesville relays issues of improper garbage disposal to state and county authorities.

An extreme-western portion of Capote, Leesville in Guadalupe County attempted to incorporate as the “City of Capote Hills,” with 16.77% of qualifying voters voting “For” and 83.23% voting “Against” in 2017. Most “blank voted” regarding proposed city council and mayor seats. The rural population near this outlying area, just west of Capote, approaches 1,647 people; as the region maps west with the more developed Guadalupe County. This unincorporated outlying-area includes the large neighborhoods of Hickory Forest, Holmes Lake and Vivroux Ranch, alongside the county line; terminating at Sand Hills near 12th Flying Training Wing (Randolph Airforce Base) in southeast Old Seguin.

Water

Upon Sandies Creek, Leesville, the Schertz-Seguin Local Government Corporation transports water from the local Carrizo Aquifer utilizing a 40-mile pipeline. This project was arranged in 2012 at a reported cost of $149-million. In 2014, this facility was permitted to pump 19,363 acre-feet of water per year, with a then-present utilization of 10,000 acre-feet. Over 60,000 households can be sustained through this water supply.

The location of the SSLGC water supply upon Leesville, between Gonzales and Guadalupe Counties, was a strategic choice to mitigate cost and provide long-term reliability of the water source for nearby cities. As of 2016, the system can store up to 11.6 million gallons of water.

Fitch Ratings remarked on this water company's inability to directly assign liabilities to either the City of Schertz or Seguin. It has also remarked that COVID-19 has not affected the demand of water from the facility. As of 2020 through 2016, the facility makes over $9.2-million in revenue each year and serves additional cities such as Selma and Universal City.

County

Agriculture

Belmont Wildlife Management Association
Leesville 4-H Club
Quien Sabe Ranch (Pioneer Santa Gertrudis Breeder); as late as 1954, this ranch has utilized a foundation stock of cattle from the herds of Richard King and a “John Martin,” claiming all to be from King Ranch Running W Bull lineage
Sandies Creek Wildlife Management Association

Transportation

 (TxDOT), corridor to 
 (TxDOT), corridor to 
Eastern bypass at County Road 143, Monthalia
, Leesville-Dewville (TxDOT), Gonzales County bypass towards Seguin (County Road 121/114 access)

Intercity

  connection (TxDOT); Downtown Leesville
 County Road 105 (78122-4205), Uptown  connection
 County Road 108 (78122-4218), East Uptown  bypass
 West County Road 109, West Uptown  bypass

Airports

 Austin-Bergstrom International Airport (58 highway-miles)

 San Antonio International Airport (70 highway-miles) 

 Corpus Christi International Airport (144 highway-miles) 

 George Bush Intercontinental Airport (174 highway-miles) 

 William P. Hobby Airport (176 highway-miles)

History

Early population

Within a limited historical record of the Leesville population, a 1904 voting press-record from The Houston Post indicates at least 708 ballots were cast in Leesville during a primary election. In the 1880s, during the Texas House of Representatives election of what was considered a Leesville district, vote counts were measured in the thousands.

One of the earliest forms of social establishment and organization in the Leesville area, or interchangeably Leesburg at the time, involved common-property of "the people of Leesburg" most-especially a single crowbar; quoted as being shared contiguously by the community from 1863 until as late as 1883, when it was thought to have been used in a local theft of the Peebles & Brown store.

Name

The first settlement and commerce of the area began around Sandies Creek, said to be once landmarked by a giant granite stone; leading to the Leesville area once being referred to as Sandies. From the 1830s until the 1870s, significant amounts of social activity climaxed around this area; with theft of watermelon, corn and food occurring at a nearby property. The nearby proprietor destroyed the granite landmark in response, ending the original rapid growth of the area.

The general area was then named Capote, named after its hills. In the late 1800s, local land developer Newburn H. Guinn attempted to name the town Leesburg after his daughter Lee. The local post office at the time refused to recognize the name, as another Texas town had already claimed the name Leesburg. It was then compromised that the city would be named Leesville.

The greater federal government recognized Leesville, Texas as early as 1885, in patents “315,236” and “325,154;” the former being an “Indicator for Merchandise” and the latter being a “Marking Device.”

In the 1800s, a significant portion of Leesville's southern territory was owned by Ezekiel Wimberly Cullen, with Leesville alternatively and legally known as the Ezekiel W. Cullen League (E.W. Cullen).

Industry
Original businesses and organizations since the area's settlement used to include, in greater capacity:
 Fayette Smith's saloon (late-1800s)
 A Masonic Lodge, with $60 in silver recorded as deposited in the local bank (late-1800s); destroyed, totaled by a fire on December 14, 1904, due to lack of insurance
 Peebles & Brown mercantile storehouse and bank, with as much as $5,000 in goods and $1,400–$1,500 in currency deposits (east-side of O'Neill Creek, late-1800s)
 Sylvester A. Hubbard‘s ox-driven corn grinder and lumber saw (1860)
 Sandies Home Guard C.S.A.; Captain Michael Erskine, First Lieutenant W. H. Burris, Second Lieutenant Larkin N. West, Third Lieutenant N. W. Guinn (June 22, 1861)
 Daniel Brown's general merchandise store (1868)
 A brick kiln (1868)
 A saddletree and stirrup factory (1868)
 Leesburg Male and Female Institute, known as “Leesville school house” (January 21, 1873)
 L.C. Cocke Pharmacy (1890s-1910s)
 Medical doctor, Dr. M. A. McBride having moved his practice from West Point, New York to Leesville, Texas (1894)
 Southern Pacific Railroad – GHSA, a "Glidden to LaGrange" ("Glidden Subdivision") spur connecting to the late "Stockdale to Cuero" branch line (constructed 1905–1907); this railway easement has been converted to an overhead power line at present-day
 Hupmobile dealership, J.W. West (1913)
 Leesville School System, elementary and high schools (closed in 1951)
 Lumber production
 Grain production
 Beef production
 Cotton production
 Peanut farming
 Melon farming
 Various churches including a Missionary Baptist church

Rail proposals

In March 1912, the Quanah, Acme and Pacific Railway was being built 2.5 miles east of Leesville; The Houston Post indicated citizens attempted to financially cause the railroad to build near the city with a "bonus offered" at the start of its construction. In the same time period, engineers of the "Quanah, Seymour, Dublin and Rockport Railroad" completed a preliminary survey for the construction of a line through Leesville.

In 1916, to "J. H. Berryman & Co." served by its president Steve Holmes from Leesville; with vice-president and general manager W. A. Reinhardt from Houston: An "electric railway" contract was awarded to grade the first 60 miles out of Houston for the "Houston Richmond & Western Traction Co." A line was proposed to reach San Antonio from Houston; stopping at Richmond, Garwood, Gonzales, Steve Holmes' home of Leesville, Willow Springs and New Berlin; totaling 190 miles of proposed track. The expected material cost was written as “530,000 cross-ties,” equivalent to “16,000,000 feet of lumber;” as well as “32,000 poles.” This was considered a notable “prospective order” for the lumber industry at the time.

Events

In 1835, at Sandies Creek in what is now Leesville, 13 traders of Mexican and French origin traveling from Louisiana to Mexico, were killed by Comanche Native Americans.

In 1889, while having lived in Leesville since 1869 with a lack of "political aspirations," over a thousand people of the Leesville general-area elected the Representative James William Peebles for the local legislative seat without Peebles direct involvement in the campaign; beating his competitor by a margin of a thousand votes. He was elected to a second-term, in the same Leesville district, from 1891.

In 1903, the Southern Coal and Coke Company noted “a vein of coal two feet thick” in Leesville, in the coal industry journal.

In 1909, there were over a dozen cases of smallpox around Leesville, spanning over months with only one case of quarantine. Traveling African-Americans were reported to be disproportionately affected.

A $500 reward was circulated “for information about the theft.”

Governor's pardon of John Hester

In 1884, in a State criminal-appeal from the District Court of Gonzales County ("Robert Carr v. The State"), John Hester was a prior-criminal and witness of a burglary of Leesville's general store, who was pardoned by Governor Ireland.

Hester had been imprisoned for the felony of stealing sheep. He was pardoned and conditionally released of his entire criminal-record for the sole purpose of being allowed to testify in a case, having "wrote a letter to the citizens of Leesville, to the effect that he wanted to change his course, and that he knew all about the robbery of Peebles & Brown's store." County Sheriff William E. Jones, having acquired his testimony, traveled to Austin, Texas and requested that the Governor grant the witness a pardon, as to make his testimony admissible in court. 

Despite the pardon being granted, it was later ruled as not a genuine nor full pardon, with the Governor having made it revocable at any time he deemed the witness criminal in his behavior, thus the Texas Court of Appeals holding the criminal witness's testimony as inadmissible and unreliable:

"Held, by the majority of the court, that such conditional pardon did not restore to the witness the competency to testify, and in permitting him to be introduced as a witness, the trial court erred." The dissent argued it was a full pardon until it was deemed revocable upon the "vitiation" of the listed condition.

Littlefield-Martin

In 1880, two generations of Leesville families Littlefield and Martin, received national attention after three Littlefield belligerents died in a revolver gunfight between the two families. It was postulated that the family feud would continue.

The late George W. Littlefield was the grandson of one of the belligerents, through a son named Fleming Littlefield; in 1883, George Littlefield relocated to the state capital of Austin, Texas from South Texas. His Littlefield Building on Congress Avenue in downtown Austin now houses Capital One Bank. From 1895 to 1903, Littlefield owned the Driskill Hotel, located near the Littlefield Building. He installed the first electric lighting system in the hotel, which became a gathering place for Texas politicians during much of the 20th century. He willed his residence, the Littlefield House, to the University of Texas.

El Capote Ranch

The founder of El Capote Ranch was Joseph de la Baume (1731–1834), a French army officer who came to North America with the Marquis de Lafayette and fought in the American Revolution. He later joined the Spanish Army and for his services received title in 1806 to 27,000 acres of Texas land in what is now Leesville – the original El Capote Ranch. "El Capote," meaning "The Cape," was probably derived from nearby hills of the same name. De la Baume's grant was reaffirmed after Mexico won independence from Spain in 1821. Virginia-born Michael Erskine (1794–1862) acquired the property in 1840. He raised cattle here and drove his herds to California and New Orleans. Since the San Antonio to Gonzales Road forded the Guadalupe River on El Capote land, many travelers passed this way.

The Erskine family hosted several eminent visitors, including William Bollaert FRGS (1840), Ferdinand von Roemer (1845–1847), and Frederick Law Olmstead (1857). After the Erskine family sold the ranch in the 1870s, part of the land was deeded to Edith Kermit Carow, the second wife of Theodore Roosevelt. During the Spanish–American War, Roosevelt rode an El Capote horse, "Seguin", at the Battle of San Juan Hill (1898). Several other horses from El Capote were used by the 1st United States Volunteer Cavalry ("Roosevelt's Rough Riders") as well.

Its former cabin (now preserved in Lubbock), dating from the late 1830s or early 1840s, was probably built by "French" Smith, de la Baume's resident overseer. Its former building served as headquarters for ranching and farming operations until the 1880s and thereafter as tenant quarters, being occupied as late as 1920. It represents the earliest form of dwelling utilized on the Texas frontier. The ranch was acquired in 1897 by Judge Leroy Gilbert Denman (1855–1916), a justice of the Texas Supreme Court, and is owned by his descendants; the cabin was donated to the Ranch Headquarters of the Museum of Texas Tech University by the heirs of Judge Denman.

The property-at-large through its liquidation in the mid-1800s, was attached to De la Baume`s 12-acre residence in the "Alameda" of Downtown San Antonio; formerly known as "La Baume Place" in "Cotton Wood Grove," being a "double-stone house" located on East Commerce Street across from the St. Joseph Catholic Church, in what is now a city park. In common, the original will of the property-at-large was signed by the first Texan mayor of San Antonio, John W. Smith.

In 1880, the editors of the San Antonio Express rated the remainder of the “Capote Farm” under its then-new proprietor Major Alexander Moore, as “the largest and most complete farm in Texas...if not in the south;” giving examples of the diversity of livestock and crops that were raised at the scale of 75 workers over 20,000 acres. The farm’s stock included 2,800 heads of cattle, 6,000 Berkshire pigs and various other segments of livestock and agriculture. Within the same time period, the lien on the property was held by the Scottish-American Mortgage Company, Ltd., financiers of the well-known Swan Land and Cattle Co. and Prairie Land and Cattle Co.

At present day, this property's remaining estate, in its apparent complexity, has generated significant caselaw in Texas, in ConocoPhillips Co. v. Ramirez: "To be entitled to summary judgment on the affirmative defense of limitations, a defendant must prove as a matter of law: (1) the date on which the limitations period commenced, i.e., when the cause of action accrued, and (2) that the plaintiff filed its petition outside the applicable limitations period. In re Estate of Denman, 362 S.W.3d 134, 144 (Tex. App.—San Antonio 2011, no pet.)" Summarily, "[h]olding that residual four-year limitations period of Texas Civil Practice and Remedies Code section 16.051 applies to declaratory judgment action to construe [the will of remaining El Capote Ranch estate]."

Ecology

The Leesville-Belmont area has an annual average of 33.1 inches and 35.8 days of rainfall. The average day consists of 12.6 hours of light. Temperatures are high with very mild winters. Generally, described as a humid subtropical climate.

Subregion

Description

In 1851, William Bollaert FRGS of the Royal Geographical Society became lost in the Leesville area, generally describing it as “Big Hill prairies.” He found the soil to be “rich looking” and “black, reposing upon recent sandstone, forming beautifully undulating lands.” Herds of mustangs, wild horses, wolves and forests of pecan trees were described. Near Guadalupe River, he found the land “fit for all agricultural purposes, although the surface soil is sandy,” the sand upon masses of silicon containing selenite. He found chiltepin peppers to be “most abundant.” The main Capote Hill was described as a “conspicuous object...isolated in the prairie” at “350 feet above.” Within, he found disintegrated limestone, gypsum, oyster and other shells; compromising a great variety of former marine life.

In 1852, Frederick Law Olmsted, then-future designer of New York City’s Central Park; noted the area’s principal species of trees as pecan, hickory, cypress, cotton wood, box elder, white oak and walnut. He described the bottom land's "rich, black clay soil" as difficult to cultivate yet "producing high yields" of agriculture.

Earlier in 1830, Byrd Lockhart described the lands beyond the river as rolling prairie, with sandy hills which were removed far from the Guadalupe River. This "rolling" sandy soil was of lower quality and was found to be covered with post oaks and blackjack oaks. Dr. Ferdinand von Roemer, in 1846, described the area summarily: "the road leading us in agreeable changes through fertile valleys or over low hills composed of gravel and sand. The country was more settled here, as we came upon farms every few miles."

Events

In 1848, over 12,000 bushels of corn were grown and sold in the Capote, Leesville area at 45 cents each; a record-size crop in Southeast Texas for facilities the size of El Capote Ranch, the record held for several years time.

In 1903, implicitly due to heavy rains, cotton crops failed at a rate of one bale per thirty acres of land.

In 1910, an agricultural report in The Houston Post on Leesville, Texas crop conditions indicates excessive dryness with most crops and pastures in a "burned" state; with cotton crops in a derelict state. Local farmers indicated cotton yields had lowered to one bale per 8 acres of land; approximately half of the year before. Corn yields improved year-on-year.

In 1912, Leesville cotton yields were rated as generally poor with corn yields excellent, despite a two-month drought. Hay crops reported satisfactory. The cotton shortfall was reported at a record low since 1904, one-third lower year-on-year.

In 1918, the Dallas "Farm and Ranch" of March 23 reported that G. N. Linecum of Leesville raised 47 bales of cotton in the previous season, on 30 acres of black sandy land "in a drought stricken area of Texas." The result was described to have been achieved through "irrigation from artesian wells and intensive cultivation."

In 1936, Leesville was once established with a number of grocery stores, barbershops, cotton production and a pharmacy; now said to be non-existent and depopulated due to flooding and displacement from a local creek, after 26 inches of sudden rain.

Through the summer and fall of 1939, G. A. C. Haiff constructed a bass pond in the Leesville area; producing a 10-inch largemouth black bass in the spring of 1940, as noted by the American Fisheries Society.

During Tropical Depression Eight of 1981, several dwellings in and around Leesville suffered water damage after the O'Neill Creek reached its highest level since at least 1936. Leesville experienced some part of the county's $5-million estimated damages, caused by the storm.

Culture

Leesville is a hub of the collection of historical remnants and cemeteries it houses, as well as its historical city center acting as an election precinct.

Philosophy

Michael Erskine, a founding settler of the area, described the values of its people summarily in 1845: "I move along here as well as I can—work hard, live poor and am respected by the poor chaps. There are but few rich people in this part of the country. And no claims to be superior to another on account of his wealth."

Politics

As late as 1906, Leesville farmers were majorly unionized under the Leesville Farmers' Union, a focus of Thomas Mitchell Campbell's 1906 Texas gubernational election

During the William Jennings Bryan 1896 presidential campaign, Leesville resident William W. Littlefield (grandfather of George W. Littlefield) acted as a delegate from Texas for the Populist Party, nominating Thomas E. Watson as an alternative vice presidential candidate against the Democratic ticket's Arthur Sewall.

According to The New York Times, during the 2016 United States presidential election, 82% of participating Leesville-Gonzales voters voted for Donald Trump and 16% voted for Hillary Clinton. In Leesville-Belmont-Luling, 79% voted for Trump and 18% voted for Clinton. In Leesville-Seguin, 75% voted for Trump and 21% voted for Clinton.

Cemeteries

Antioch Cemetery, containing the grave of the late Leesville resident, Representative James W. Peebles of the 21st & 22nd Texas Legislature
Askey African-American Cemetery (unmaintained)
Caraway Cemetery
Dewville Cemetery
Leesville Cemetery, acting as an election polling place
Leesville Latin-American Cemetery, divided and fenced from Leesville Cemetery
O'Neill Cemetery
Sandies Chapel Cemetery
Union Hill Cemetery

Churches

Camp Valley Full Gospel Church
Dewville United Methodist Church
Leesville Baptist Church, held regionally-publicized citywide revivals as late as 1904
Leesville Encouraging Word Church, former election polling place
Leesville Methodist Church, acting as an election polling place

Neighborhoods

 County Road 159 West (78122-4209), West Midtown access-road
 County Road 102, West Uptown; Quien Sabe Ranch
 East County Road 104 (78122-4238), Northeast O'Neill Creek – Baker Branch
 West County Road 104 (78122-4272), East Fork O'Neill Creek
 East County Road 109, East Uptown access-road
 County Road 155, Downtown loop and bypass
 County Road 159 East (78122-4273), East Midtown access-road
 Sandies Creek Bridge – , 8000-block (78122-428X)
 County Road 114 / 157 / 113, Sandies Creek embankments
 County Road 121, west end divide
 ; “The Y,” a Gonzales-Luling highway-intersection

Notable people

 African-American Los Angeles—Patrolman Frank E. Corley of the LAPD, was born July 14, 1895, in Leesville, Texas. In 1924, leaving behind a wife and two children, he served Los Angeles for only three years before being shot and killed while aiding another police officer. His African-American identity was not revealed until 1998. Notably, alone he had captured an armed bank robber at the Pacific Southwest Bank on LA's 7th Street.
John Beecher, descendant of Harriet Beecher Stowe the author of Uncle Tom's Cabin, reported on Leesville working conditions and labor unionism.

Ghost towns

The border of Leesville once acted as a location of these former towns:

West

From 1869 until circa 1940, a community with the duplicate name of "Capote, Texas" established itself on the far west-end of Farm to Market Road 466. The community centered around the former Capote Baptist Church and became inhabited by former slaves who worked 3 potteries, termed The Wilson Potteries; originally founded by slave-master John McKamey Wilson. In 1904, Capote had 3 single-teacher schools for 44 white students, and 3 schools and 4 teachers for 137 African-American students. Only its abandoned church landmarks the former community from the 1980s to present-day. Hiram Wilson, an owner of the former Wilson Potteries in West Capote, is credited with being the first "black businessman" in Texas, by the University of Texas.

Southwest

 Albuquerque, Texas; where outlaw John Wesley Hardin murdered Jack Helm in 1873
 Dewville, Texas; named after the Dew brothers, operators of a local steam-powered gin in 1885
 Sandies Chapel, Texas; named after its former church that was moved to Dewville in 1897

East

Bebe, Texas; the community had an estimated population of 52 in 2000. A post office called Bebe was established in 1900, and remained in operation until 2002. The community was named after the brand-name Beebee baking powder.

Folklore
In folklore, locals claim to see a ghost of a little girl in a blue dress, playing in Leesville Cemetery; seen only at a significant distance.

See also
 Texas Blackland Prairies

References

General references
“Telling It Like It Was”...Beatrice O’Neill...charter member of the Leesville Historical Commission...

John Beecher. Like it Be's in Leesville; Deep in the Heart of Texas. United States, Workers Press, 1980.

External links

 Sandies Creek, Leesville, Texas
 Newspaper Archives; Leesville, Texas
Leesville, Gonzales Inquirer (No Obituaries)

Auctioned Campbell jersey won at Leesville fair

 Greater San Antonio
Railway towns in Texas
Populated places established in 1874
1874 establishments in Texas
1861 establishments in the Confederate States of America
Unincorporated communities in Guadalupe County, Texas
Unincorporated communities in Gonzales County, Texas
Former Masonic buildings in Texas
Former school districts in Texas